María La Baja is a town and municipality located in the Bolívar Department, northern Colombia.

History
María La Baja was founded by Alonso de Heredia (brother of Pedro de Heredia) on December 8, 1535.

Geography and climate
The municipality of María La Baja has a total area of 547 km², bordering to the north with the municipality of Arjona, to the east with the municipalities of Mahates and San Juan Nepomuceno, south with the municipalities of El Carmen de Bolívar and San Jacinto and to the west with the municipality of San Onofre, Sucre. The town of María La Baja has an area of approximately 150 km² and it is some 72 km away from the Department's capital Cartagena.

A warm climate prevails throughout the year at an average temperature of 28 °C.

Involvement in armed conflict

María La Baja has grown substantially in recent years as some 7000 people have moved into the town from the surrounding countryside, since 2000 when the FARC guerrilla group arrived in the hills nearby. According to reports the FARC militants stole cattle. The situation deteriorated further when AUC paramilitaries began to battle FARC, catching civilians in the crossfire.  However the security situation has improved more recently with the AUC bloc Heroes de los Montes de María giving up their weapons on July 14, 2005, under a national demobilization plan speared by the government of Álvaro Uribe. Marines have set up a base on the edge of the town.

References

 María la Baja official website

Municipalities of Bolívar Department
Populated places established in 1535
1535 establishments in New Spain